The 2000 season was the Baltimore Ravens' fifth in the National Football League (NFL) and the second under head coach Brian Billick. The Ravens ended the season as Super Bowl XXXV Champions.

The Ravens concluded their season with a 12–4 record, finishing 2nd in the AFC Central and qualifying for the playoffs as a wild card team. In the franchise's first post-season appearance, the Ravens won all three games, culminating in a trip to Tampa, Florida for Super Bowl XXXV, where they defeated the New York Giants, 34–7. The team's defense, which set a league record for fewest points allowed in a 16-game regular season with 10.3 points per game, is considered among the greatest of all time, including 4 games where they kept their opponents from scoring.

Though just five seasons removed from the team's relocation from Cleveland, only three players (Matt Stover, Rob Burnett, Larry Webster) and no coaches remained from the 1995 Cleveland Browns roster and staff.

The Ravens ranked #22 on the 100 greatest teams of all time presented by the NFL on its 100th anniversary. They were the highest ranked team which did not win its division, and also the highest that had to win 4 playoff games.

Offseason
The Ravens spent most of the offseason concerned with the status of their star linebacker Ray Lewis, who, along with two acquaintances, was arrested and charged with murder after an incident outside an Atlanta nightclub on January 31, 2000. On June 5, a plea bargain was struck, and murder and aggravated assault charges were dropped in exchange for Lewis' testimony against his companions. Lewis pleaded guilty to one count of obstruction of justice and was sentenced to one year of probation. The NFL fined Lewis $250,000.

The Ravens made some key moves in the offseason to help bolster the team. They signed defensive tackle Sam Adams and tight end Shannon Sharpe in free agency. They used the fifth overall pick in the first round of the 2000 NFL Draft on running back Jamal Lewis.

Draft

Season summary

The Ravens started the season with a 5–1 mark, with three of their victories coming by shutout. Despite the great play of the defense, the offense had major struggles after the first month of the season. Following a 37–0 victory over the Cincinnati Bengals, the Ravens would not score a touchdown for five consecutive games. The Ravens won the first two of these games due to their defense and field goals from kicker Matt Stover, then lost the next three, including a critical division loss at home to the Tennessee Titans. During this game, quarterback Tony Banks was benched in favor of Trent Dilfer, who would take over for the rest of the season. After a loss at home to Pittsburgh to fall to 5–4, the Ravens broke both their touchdown-less streak and losing streak against the Bengals the next week. It would be the first of seven straight wins to end the regular season.

The Ravens finished one game behind the Titans in the AFC Central, so the Ravens had to begin their playoff run at home in the wild card round against the Denver Broncos. The team cruised to a 21–3 victory, setting up a date with the Titans the following week in Nashville. The Ravens prevailed 24–10, with linebacker Ray Lewis's 50-yard interception return for a touchdown clinching the game. The team then traveled to Oakland to meet the Raiders for the right to represent the AFC in the Super Bowl. The Ravens advanced to their first Super Bowl after a 16–3 victory, as the defense held Oakland, the league's top rushing offense during the season, to just 24 yards on the ground. The Ravens easily defeated the Giants in Super Bowl XXXV, 34–7, as Ray Lewis led another dominant performance by the defense and was named most valuable player of the game for his efforts.

The Ravens relied heavily on their defense, which set several NFL records during the 2000 season, including fewest points ever allowed during a 16-game season (165) and fewest rushing yards ever allowed (970). The defense also forced more turnovers than any team in the league that year (49), and Ray Lewis was named NFL Defensive Player of the Year by the Associated Press. Starting cornerbacks Chris McAlister and Duane Starks combined to intercept ten passes, and defensive end Rob Burnett contributed with 10.5 sacks. Defensive tackle Sam Adams was voted to the Pro Bowl and first-team All-Pro, as was safety Rod Woodson, who had four interceptions and ranked second on the team in tackles during the regular season. The defense also had plenty of other key players, including linebacker Jamie Sharper, outside linebacker Peter Boulware, and defensive tackle Tony Siragusa. Siragusa played alongside Sam Adams, as the two men combining for nearly 700 pounds and were big factors in the Ravens setting the run-stopping record.

Offensively, the Ravens relied heavily on the running game. Rookie running back Jamal Lewis led the way with 1,364 yards and veteran Priest Holmes added 588 rushing yards. The passing game was rather pedestrian (23rd in yards passing), but Trent Dilfer brought stability to the position when he took over for Tony Banks mid-season. Tight end Shannon Sharpe, acquired as an unrestricted free agent from Denver during the offseason, was the team's leading pass receiver with 67 catches for 810 yards. Left tackle Jonathan Ogden was selected first-team All-Pro, and widely regarded as the league's best Offensive Lineman. The Ravens also had one of the best special teams units in the NFL. Return specialist Jermaine Lewis scored two touchdowns on punt returns during the season, and ran back a kickoff for a touchdown in the Super Bowl. Placekicker Matt Stover made 35 field goals on 39 attempts and was voted to the Pro Bowl and first team All-Pro.

The 2000 Ravens team marked Baltimore's first playoff appearance in 23 years, since the Baltimore Colts were AFC East champions and made it to the AFC Divisional game in 1977.

Staff

Final roster

Schedule

Preseason

Regular season

Note: Intra-division opponents are in bold text.

Division standings

Game summaries

Regular season

Week 1: at Pittsburgh Steelers

In the opening game for Baltimore's regular season, they squared off against division rivals Pittsburgh Steelers at their turf. In a game where the Ravens had 336 yards of total offense, they first scored points with a field goal kick from Matt Stover. Later in the first quarter, Qadry Ismail would catch a pass from Tony Banks for seven more points. After another field goal kick, the Steelers were being shut out by the end of halftime, 13–0. The final score in the game resulted from another field goal from Stover, and the final score resulted with the Ravens winning 16–0. With this win, the Ravens began their season at 1–0.

Week 2: vs. Jacksonville Jaguars

At the Ravens first home game, Baltimore trailed the Jacksonville Jaguars for the majority of the game, where the home team gained another 300+ yards of total offense. The first quarter was dominated by Jacksonville, where the time period ended with two touchdown passes from Mark Brunell to Jimmy Smith and a field goal from Mike Hollis (17–0). Baltimore put up their first points in the second quarter with a touchdown pass from Tony Banks to Travis Taylor. However, the first half ended with two more field goals from the Jaguars. The third quarter began with the Ravens trailing 23–7. Two further touchdowns by the Ravens (one which was for two extra points) and a field goal from Jaguars put the home team with less than a touchdown differential. In the continuing scoring shootout, the Ravens scored first in the fourth quarter with a touchdown to lead for the first time during the entire game, 29–26. By the later portion of the quarter, the Jaguars had surpassed Baltimore once more at 36–32. In the last scoring drive of the game, Shannon Sharpe completed a 29-yard pass from Banks to defeat Jacksonville, 39–36. With this win, Baltimore's record elevated to 2–0.

Week 3: at Miami Dolphins

In week 3, the Ravens and the Miami Dolphins gained little offense in a defensive struggle for both teams. The first half was highlighted by Dolphins placekicker Olindo Mare's two field goals. The Ravens attacked back during the second half, with two field goals of their own by Matt Stover; however, with a touchdown pass from Jay Fiedler to Lamar Smith and a rushing touchdown from the latter, the Dolphins overcame Baltimore 19–6. In a game where the Ravens got just above 250 yards of total offense, Baltimore ultimately fell to a 2–1 record.

Week 4: vs. Cincinnati Bengals

In an attempt to redeem their road loss to the Dolphins, the Ravens faced division rivals Cincinnati Bengals. In a complete shut out, the Ravens gained a near 400 yards (391 yards exact) in a game where the defense shut down the Bengals for only 94 yards of offense. During the first half, the Ravens scored three touchdowns (two passes from Tony Banks to Travis Taylor and Shannon Sharpe, and a rush by Jamal Lewis) and a field goal by Matt Stover. The second half ended with two more field goals and a rushing touchdown from Obafemi Ayanbadejo to finish with a score of 37–0. With this win, Baltimore's record elevated to 3–1.

Week 5: at Cleveland Browns

The Ravens began a five-game touchdown drought with their matchup against Cleveland. In a game dominated by both defenses, the Ravens allowed just under 250 offensive yards. The first half ended with three field goals from kicker Matt Stover, with the longest being from 45 yards in order to advance the Ravens to the locker room at 9–0. The final scoring in the game came during the third quarter when Stover kicked another field goal from 22 yards. In a shutout for the Browns, the Ravens improved their record to 4–1.

Week 6: at Jacksonville Jaguars

Baltimore would travel back to Jacksonville in a Week 2 rematch against the Jaguars at their turf in Jacksonville. The Ravens went with their second consecutive game without a touchdown with their kicker Matt Stover delivering all their points. In the first quarter, Jaguars kicker Steve Lindsey delivered a 49-yard field goal but was answered with a Stover 47-yard field goal to tie up the game. The second quarter ended with another Stover kick that would take the game to halftime with the Ravens winning 6–3. Stover would kick three more consecutive field goals to increase the score to 15–3, but the Jaguars retaliated with the final score of the game: a 1-yard rushing touchdown from Fred Taylor. However, the game was ultimately decided at 15–10 and the Ravens record elevated to 5–1.

Week 7: at Washington Redskins

The Ravens traveled to their Capital Beltway neighbors, the Washington Redskins, for their third straight road game. In a defensive struggle, both teams allowed under 250 yards of total offense. Halftime ended with both teams tied at 3–3 as a result of two field goals: one from the Redskins (37 yards by Kris Heppner) and the Ravens (Matt Stover from 51 yards). That field goal from Stover would be the only score that the Ravens put up in this game, where in the fourth quarter, Stephen Davis ran for a 33-yard touchdown that put Washington 10–3 over the Ravens. With this final score, the Ravens suffered their second loss and fell to 5–2.

Week 8: vs. Tennessee Titans

In Week 8, the Ravens flew back home to face off against division rivals Tennessee Titans. The Ravens continued their touchdown-less streak, where Matt Stover produced the only score for Baltimore with two field goals (from the 21- and 38-yard lines). In the second quarter, Titans quarterback Steve McNair threw a 9-yard pass to Rodney Thomas to go ahead of the home team. Just under one point, the Ravens sought to get ahead of Tennessee, however, Tony Banks produced a game high of three interceptions, with the last one sealing the game for the Titans as they won 14–6. With this loss, the Ravens fell to 5–3.

Week 9: vs. Pittsburgh Steelers

In a rematch from week 1, Baltimore continued their streak without a touchdown. However, second-string quarterback Trent Dilfer started in replacement of Tony Banks, who in the past four games had not thrown one touchdown but rather more interceptions. In this game, unlike Banks, Dilfer threw no interceptions but was unable to connect with any receiver into the endzone. The Ravens had the advantage heading into halftime with two field goals from Matt Stover that were over 40 yards. In the third quarter, the Steelers retaliated with six points of their own as a result of a touchdown and a missed extra point from Kris Brown.

Week 10: at Cincinnati Bengals

In a rematch of Week 4, the Ravens traveled to Ohio against AFC Central adversaries, Bengals. Matt Stover put the Ravens on the board with three points after a 38-yard field goal in the first quarter. Baltimore entered their season best second quarter in this game with three touchdown passes from new starting quarterback Trent Dilfer that had the Ravens up by 24 unanswered points. Cincinnati answered with a touchdown, and their only score, during the third quarter with Peter Warrick's 4-yard rush. The game came to a close following a field goal from Stover that had the Ravens defeat the Bengals 27–7. The Ravens improved their record to 6–4 and began a seven-game winning streak.

Week 11: at Tennessee Titans

Just after battling against Tennessee three weeks earlier, Baltimore traveled to Nashville to face off against the Titans. The Ravens scored first on a 46-yard reception by Qadry Ismail from Trent Dilfer in the first quarter. Jamal Lewis would then double the points with a 2-yard rush that put up the Ravens 14–0 during the second quarter. The Titans answered with two touchdown passes from Steve McNair to Derrick Mason and Lorenzo Neal, respectively. After a field goal from Matt Stover, halftime stood at 17–14, favoring the Ravens. In a defensive struggle in the third quarter, no team was able to score. However, the game became tied at 17–17 with a 23-yard field goal from Al Del Greco upon the final quarter. Tennessee sought to end the game after Perry Phenix intercepted a pass from Dilfer and returned it 87 yards for a touchdown; however, Del Greco failed to convert the extra point. This allowed the Ravens to end the game with a touchdown pass to Patrick Johnson from Dilfer and a successful extra point conversion. The Titans did drive into field goal range in the final seconds, but Del Greco missed a 43 yard field goal as time expired. With this win, the Ravens raised their record to 7–4 and became the first team to defeat the Titans in Adelphia Coliseum.

Week 12: vs. Dallas Cowboys

The Ravens defense put up another dominant performance in a 27–0 shutout of the Dallas Cowboys. Troy Aikman threw three interceptions and the Cowboys were held to 192 total yards and went 1/10 on third down. On the other hand, the Ravens offense racked up 479 total yards, which would be the most yards they would have that season. Jamal Lewis rushed for 187 yards and Priest Holmes put the game well out of reach with a late fourth quarter touchdown. With their third-straight win, the Ravens improved to 8–4, matching their win total from the previous season.

Postseason

AFC wild card game vs Denver Broncos

AFC Divisional Playoff Game at Tennessee Titans

AFC Championship Game at Oakland Raiders

Super Bowl XXXV vs New York Giants 

The Ravens and Giants set a Super Bowl record by scoring three touchdowns in three consecutive plays, tallying just 36 seconds in the third quarter. The Ravens defense completely shut down the Giants offense, not yielding a single point. The only points the Giants would score on would be a kickoff return for a touchdown. The Ravens held the Giants to 152 total yards of offense and forced five turnovers along with four sacks. The Ravens defense surrendered just one offensive touchdown in four playoff games and only allowed 16 points (4.0 points per game).

Defensive legacy
The Ravens defense in 2000 is often named among the greatest NFL defenses of all time. Baltimore gave up only 970 rushing yards (60.6 per game) all year, an NFL record for a 16-game season, and 186 fewer yards than the next lowest team, Baltimore's Super Bowl XXXV opponent, the New York Giants. Baltimore gave up only five rushing touchdowns all season, and allowed a paltry 2.7 yards per rush, both league bests. Baltimore only allowed 165 points all season, also an NFL record for a 16-game season. Including the postseason, Baltimore's defense allowed only 188 points in 20 games to opposing offenses that year (9.4 points per game). The Ravens allowed three other touchdowns that came from their opponents' defense and special teams (two interception returns and one kickoff return). Furthermore, the Ravens recovered an astronomical 26 opponent's fumbles during the season, double the total of the second-ranked team. Their defense also intercepted 23 passes to give them a total of 49 turnovers forced that season, most in the NFL. They did all of this despite their own offense's passing struggles and going five consecutive games without scoring a touchdown.

Statistical site Football Outsiders noted, "One more interesting note on the Baltimore defense: it was the only dominant defense of the past few years to be based on stopping the run instead of controlling the pass. For all the clichés about the need to stop the run, in general the best defenses are ranked the highest because they have the best ratings against the pass, not against the run – just like the best offenses are ranked the highest because they are the best through the air, not on the ground. The 2000 Ravens only rank seventh in defense against the pass, but their rushing defense ... is far and away the best of the past six seasons."

Awards
Middle linebacker Ray Lewis was named NFL Defensive Player of the Year by the Associated Press. Five players represented the Ravens in the Pro Bowl: Lewis joined defensive tackle Sam Adams, safety Rod Woodson, offensive tackle Jonathan Ogden, and kicker Matt Stover. Matt Stover joined Lewis and Ogden on the associated press' All-Pro first team. Defensive end Rob Burnett joined Adams and Woodson on the AP All-Pro second team.
 Sam Adams, AFC Pro Bowl Selection,
 Brian Billick, USA Today AFC Coach of the Year,
 Trent Dilfer, Football Digest Comeback Player of the Year,
 Jamal Lewis, USA Today Offensive Rookie of the Year,
 Marvin Lewis, Football Digest Assistant Coach of the Year,
 Marvin Lewis, Pro Football Writers Association Assistant Coach of the Year,
 Marvin Lewis, USA Today AFC Assistant Coach of the Year,
 Ray Lewis, Associated Press Defensive Player of the Year,
 Ray Lewis, Football Digest Defensive Player of the Year,
 Ray Lewis, Pro Football Writers Association Defensive Most Valuable Player,
 Jonathan Ogden, AFC Pro Bowl Selection,
 Matt Stover, Golden Toe Award
 Rod Woodson, AFC Pro Bowl Selection,

References

Baltimore Ravens seasons
Baltimore Ravens
American Football Conference championship seasons
Super Bowl champion seasons
Baltimore Ravens
2000s in Baltimore